Aban is a rural locality (a settlement) and the administrative center of Abansky District of Krasnoyarsk Krai, Russia. Population:

Geography

History
It was first mentioned in 1762. It was granted urban-type settlement status in 1965 and held it until January 1, 2007, when it was demoted in status to that of a settlement of rural type.

Economy
Coal output (the Abansky coal deposit). Logging, timber treatment, creamery, light industry enterprises.

Mars
The name Aban has been used for a crater on the planet Mars by the International Astronomical Union, although not specifically commemorating the village.

References

Notes

Sources

Rural localities in Krasnoyarsk Krai
Abansky District
Yeniseysk Governorate